Walter Picken (1 February 1900–1981) was an English footballer who played in the Football League for Rotherham County and Rotherham United.

References

1900 births
1981 deaths
English footballers
Association football midfielders
English Football League players
Rotherham County F.C. players
Rotherham United F.C. players